Miwaku No Jazz (Japanese title,  = Fascinating Jazz) is an album featuring Toshiko Mariano's (Toshiko Akiyoshi's) piano in a small jazz combo setting.  It was originally released in Japan in 1963 by Victor Records and was reissued on CD in 2006 by Think! Records.

Track listing 
LP side A
"After You've Gone" 
"Going Home" 
"Love is a Many Splendored Thing" 
"Lover, Come Back to Me" 
"Smoke Gets in Your Eyes" 
"SAIKAI"
LP side B
"It's All Right with Me" 
"My Melancholy Baby" 
"La Mer" 
"I Can't Stop Loving You" 
"Les Feuilles Mortes" 
"Bewitched"

Personnel
Toshiko Mariano – piano
Charlie Mariano – alto saxophone (except tracks A1, 3, 6, B3)
Akira Miyazawa (宮沢昭) – tenor saxophone, flute (tracks A1, B5)
Akira Fukuhara (福原彰) – trumpet (tracks A4, B1)
Masanaga Harada (原田政長) – bass (tracks A1, 3, 5, B5, 6)
Yasuo Arakawa (荒川康男) – bass (except tracks A1, 3, 5, B5, 6)
Takeshi Inomata (猪俣猛) – drums

References
Victor JV-5084
Victor SJL-5060 
Think! THCD-028

1963 albums
Toshiko Akiyoshi albums